The 2019 Seychelles First Division is the 40th season of Seychelles First Division, the top-tier football league in Seychelles. The season started on 9 March 2019.

Due to transitional season, the teams are divided into two mini-leagues. There are no official overall champions.

Mahé League
Some results are unknown and have been inferred.

Inner-Island League

Some results are unknown and have been inferred.

References

Football leagues in Seychelles
First Division
Seychelles